Hollyvilla is a home rule-class city in Jefferson County, Kentucky, United States. The population was 537 at the 2010 census.

A cat is currently in the running for Mayor of the city, with voting taking place on the city website.

Geography
Holsclaw Hill rises just south of the city limits.

Demographics

As of the census of 2000, there were 481 people, 194 households, and 149 families residing in the city. The racial makeup of the city was 97.71% White, 0.83% African American, 0.42% from other races, and 1.04% from two or more races. Hispanic or Latino of any race were 0.62% of the population.

There were 194 households, out of which 28.9% had children under the age of 18 living with them, 63.4% were married couples living together, 9.3% had a female householder with no husband present, and 22.7% were non-families. 18.0% of all households were made up of individuals, and 5.2% had someone living alone who was 65 years of age or older. The average household size was 2.48 and the average family size was 2.82.

In the city, the population was spread out, with 20.4% under the age of 18, 8.9% from 18 to 24, 30.6% from 25 to 44, 25.6% from 45 to 64, and 14.6% who were 65 years of age or older. The median age was 40 years. For every 100 females, there were 92.4 males. For every 100 females age 18 and over, there were 93.4 males.

The median income for a household in the city was $37,143, and the median income for a family was $37,813. Males had a median income of $28,625 versus $22,841 for females. The per capita income for the city was $17,440. About 5.3% of families and 4.6% of the population were below the poverty line, including 11.1% of those under age 18 and 4.8% of those age 65 or over.

References

Cities in Jefferson County, Kentucky
Cities in Kentucky
Populated places established in 1958
1958 establishments in Kentucky